Galvanic isolation is a principle of isolating functional sections of electrical systems to prevent current flow; no direct conduction path is permitted. Energy or information can still be exchanged between the sections by other means, such as capacitive, inductive, radiative, optical, acoustic or mechanical.

Galvanic isolation is used where two or more electric circuits must communicate, but their grounds may be at different potentials. It is an effective method of breaking ground loops by preventing unwanted current from flowing between two units sharing a ground conductor. Galvanic isolation is also used for safety, preventing accidental electric shocks.

Methods

Transformer
Transformers couple by magnetic flux. The primary and secondary windings of a transformer are not connected to each other (an autotransformer has a conductive connection between its windings and so does not provide isolation). The voltage difference that may safely be applied between windings without risk of breakdown (the isolation voltage) is specified in kilovolts by an industry standard. The same applies to transductors. While transformers are usually used to change voltages, isolation transformers with a 1:1 ratio are used in safety applications.

If two electronic systems have a common ground, they are not galvanically isolated. The common ground might not normally and intentionally have connection to functional poles, but might become connected. For this reason isolation transformers do not supply a GND/earth pole.

Opto-isolator
Opto-isolators transmit information by light waves. The sender (light source) and receiver (photosensitive device) are not electrically connected. Typically they are held in place within a matrix of transparent, insulating plastic or within an integrated circuit.

Capacitor
Capacitors allow alternating current (AC) to flow, but block direct current; they couple ac signals between circuits at different direct voltages. Where capacitors are used for isolation from power supply circuits, they may carry special ratings to indicate they cannot fail in a short-circuit, possibly connecting a device to high voltage or presenting an electrical shock hazard.

Hall effect
Hall effect sensors allow an inductor to transfer information across a small gap magnetically. Unlike opto-isolators they do not contain a light source with a finite life, and in contrast to a transformer based approach they don't require DC balancing.

Magnetoresistance
Magnetocouplers use giant magnetoresistance (GMR) to couple from AC down to DC.

Relay
One side operates the magnetic coil of an isolation relay. The other side is connected to switched contacts.

Applications
Optocouplers are used within a system to decouple a function block from another connected to the power grid or other high voltage, for safety and equipment protection. For example, power semiconductors connected to the line voltage may be switched by optocouplers driven from low-voltage circuits, which need not be insulated for the higher line voltage. 

Transformers allow the output of a device to "float" relative to ground to avoid 
potential ground loops. Power isolation transformers  increase the safety of a device, so that a person touching a live portion of the circuit will not have current flow through them to earth. Power sockets intended for electric razor supply may use an isolation transformer to prevent an electric shock if the razor should be dropped into water.

See also
 Galvanic isolator, a device for preventing current flow in a ground or protective conductor
 Luigi Galvani
 History of electrochemistry

References

External links
 Galvanic Isolation: Purpose and Methodologies

Electricity concepts
Electronic circuits